The Pambak, is a river in the region of Lori Province in Northern Armenia and a tributary of the Debed river. It originates in the Pambak Mountains and flows west to east through spectacular gorges around Bazum Mountains. It finally feeds into the Debed river near Dzoragyugh, which ultimately drains to the Kura.

References

Rivers of Armenia